El Progreso is a department in Guatemala. The departmental capital is Guastatoya. The Spanish established themselves in the region by 1551, after the Spanish conquest of Guatemala. El Progreso was declared a department in 1908, but was dissolved in 1920 before being reestablished in 1934. Guastatoya was badly affected by the 1976 Guatemala earthquake.

The department is located in northeastern Guatemala. It is bordered by the departments of Alta Verapaz, Baja Verapaz, Guatemala, Jalapa, and Zacapa. The department occupies an intermediate zone between the hot lowlands and the cooler Guatemalan Highlands, and has a generally hot climate. The most important river is the Motagua. To the north, the department is crossed by the Sierra de las Minas mountain range. The main population centres in El Progreso are Guastatoya, Sanarate and San Agustín Acasaguastlán. The department is crossed by the CA-9 Atlantic Highway, linking it with Guatemala City and the Atlantic port of Puerto Barrios.

The vast majority of the population of the department are Spanish-speaking Ladinos. The population is growing, but at a rate below the national average. At the same time, the illiteracy rate is falling.

History
Historically, the area now included in the department of El Progreso was known as Guastatoya or Huastatoya, derived from Nahuatl huäxyötl or huäxin ("calabash") and atoyac ("last"), meaning the last place that calabashes grow, a reference to the change in altitude that occurs in the department, and corresponding climatic change from cold to hot.

Early history
The Spanish colonial corregimiento of San Cristóbal Acasaguastlán was established in 1551 with its seat in the town of that name, in what is now the eastern portion of the modern department. Most of the area of the modern department fell within the corregimiento of Chiquimula. Acasaguastlán was one of few pre-conquest centres of population in the middle Motagua River drainage, due to the arid climate. In El Progreso it included San Agustín de la Real Corona (modern San Agustín Acasaguastlán) and La Magdalena, but covered a broad area that also included parts of Baja Verapaz and Zacapa. San Cristóbal Acasaguastlán and the surrounding area were reduced into colonial settlements by friars of the Dominican Order; at the time of the conquest the area was inhabited by Poqomchi' Maya and by the Nahuatl-speaking Pipil. In the 1520s, immediately after conquest, the inhabitants paid taxes to the Spanish Crown in the form of cacao, textiles, gold, silver and slaves. Within a few decades taxes were instead paid in beans, cotton and maize. Acasaguastlán was first given in encomienda to conquistador Diego Salvatierra in 1526. The region was subject to a strong influx of Spanish colonists due to its location on the route between the colonial capital and the Caribbean Sea, and hence to Spain, resulting in the hispanicisation of the territory. Guastatoya was mentioned as a village in an edict issued in Santiago de los Caballeros de Guatemala, the colonial capital, in 1758. In 1825, various settlements were integrated into the Acasagustlán district that would later be included in El Progreso department. In the 1870s, the territory was divided between the departments of Guatemala, Zacapa and Chiquimula.

Departmental history
The department of El Progreso was created by executive decree on 13 April 1908, to include the municipalities of Acasaguastlán, Cabañas, Guastatoya (which was renamed as El Progreso), Morazán, Sanarate, Sansaria (now known as Sansare), San Antonio La Paz, and San José El Golfo. For a short time from December 1919 to June of the following year, the department was renamed Estrada Cabrera at the request of its constituent municipalities, in order to honour the then-president. On 9 June 1920, after the president was overthrown, the department was dissolved by the government. The municipalities that it had incorporated were returned to their previous jurisdictions. The department was reestablished on 3 April 1934 by the legislative assembly.

The departmental capital of Guastatoya was badly affected by the 1976 Guatemala earthquake, which completely destroyed all historic architecture in the town.

Geography
The department of El Progreso is located in northeastern Guatemala. It is bordered to the southwest by the department of Guatemala, to the southeast by Jalapa, to the east by Zacapa, to the west by Baja Verapaz, and to the north by the department of Alta Verapaz. The departmental capital is Guastatoya. The department occupies an intermediate zone between the hot lowlands and the cooler Guatemalan Highlands.

The department has a generally hot climate. The most important river is the Motagua. Other rivers in El Progreso include the Hato, Huija, Huyús, Las Ovejas, Morazán, Plátanos, and Sanarate rivers. To the north of the Motagua, the department is crossed by the Sierra de las Minas mountain range.

The main population centres in El Progreso are Sanarate, Guastatoya, and San Agustín Acasaguastlán. The CA-9 Atlantic Highway crosses the department from west to east, en route from Guatemala City to the Atlantic port of Puerto Barrios. Other principal highways are the CA-17 from El Rancho towards Cobán, and the RN-19 from Sanarate towards Jalapa.

Population
According to the 2018 census, the population of El Progreso was 176,632. In 2013, the non-indigenous proportion of the population was 98.2% against 1.8% indigenous. The majority of the population consists of Spanish-speaking Ladinos, although some traces of indigenous culture survive, such as in modes of dress, linguistic traces, and local customs and beliefs. By 2013 the total population had grown to 163,537. The 2012–2013 population growth rate was 1.73%, below the national average of 2.32%. By gender, 51.9% of the population are female, and 48.1% male. The majority of the population, 59.8%, lives in the rural portion of the department. The predominant language in El Progreso is Guatemalan Spanish. In 2013, 89.2% of the population were recorded as literate, with a year-on-year drop in illiteracy from 16.1% in 2009.

Mortality
In 2013, 930 deaths were registered in the department, demonstrating a 3.5% drop on the previous year, and 1.3% of the national total:

Economy and agriculture
Agricultural products include coffee, sugar cane, tobacco, maize, beans, cacao, annatto, tomatoes, vanilla, cotton, and a variety of other fruits. Tomato production is especially important in El Progreso, representing 6% of the national total. Local craft production includes basketwork, ropemaking, leatherwork, items fashioned from palm, and tulle netting. Sanarate has the greatest economic production in the department, followed by Guastatoya, then San Agustín Acasaguastlán.

Tourism
Local tourist attractions include thermal baths near Sanarate and San Antonio La Paz.

Archaeological sites
The best preserved archaeological site in the region is Guaytán, which was inhabited from the Late Preclassic to the Late Classic periods of Mesoamerican chronology (approximately from 250 BC to 900 AD), and was  an important centre for the distribution of jade.

Municipalities 

El Progreso is divided into eight municipalities:
 El Jícaro
 Guastatoya
 Morazán
 San Agustín Acasaguastlán
 San Antonio La Paz
 San Cristóbal Acasaguastlán
 Sanarate
 Sansare

Notes

References

Arroyave Prera, Ana Lucia (2012). Recordando a Guaytán, una propuesta de restauración en la acrópolis y en el Juego de Pelota B2 (in Spanish). XXV  Simposio de Investigaciones Arqueológicas en Guatemala, 2011 (edited by  B.  Arroyo,  L. Paiz,  and  H.  Mejía),  pp. 601–610.  Guatemala: Ministerio  de  Cultura  y  Deportes,  Instituto  de  Antropología  e  Historia  and Asociación Tikal. Retrieved 2016-10-29. Archived from the original on 2016-05-15.
Feldman, Lawrence H. (1998). Motagua Colonial. Raleigh, North Carolina, US: Boson Books. . . Archived from the original on 2015-01-21. Retrieved 2016-10-29.
Gran Diccionario Náhuatl [online] (2012). "Huaxin" (in Spanish). Mexico City: Universidad Nacional Autónoma de México. Retrieved 2016-10-29. 
Hernández, Gonzalo (8 August 2004). Mapa No. 5: El Progreso: También conocida como la tierra de los ayotes (PDF) (in Spanish). Guatemala: Prensa Libre. Retrieved 2010-12-26. Archived from the original on 2011-12-03.
INE (2014). Caracterización departamental de El Progreso 2013 (in Spanish). Guatemala: Instituto Nacional de Estadística. Retrieved 2016-10-29. Archived from the original on 2015-07-20.
ITMB Publishing (1998). Guatemala (Map) (3rd ed.). 1:500000. International Travel Maps. ITMB Publishing Ltd. . .
Low, S. M. (1989), "Gender, Emotion, and Nervios in urban Guatemala". In Dona L. Davis and Setha M. Low. Gender, Health And Illness: The Case Of Nerves. New York, Washington, and Philadelphia, US and London, UK: Taylor & Francis. pp. 115–140. . .
Ministerio de Economía (2015). Información Socioeconómica de Guatemala: Departamento de El Progreso (in Spanish). Guatemala: Ministerio de Economía. Archived from the original on 2016-10-29. Retrieved 2016-10-29.
Municipalidad de San Cristóbal Acasaguastlán (2011). "Historia del Municipio" (in Spanish). Municipalidad de San Cristóbal Acasaguastlán. Archived from the original on 2014-01-03. Retrieved 2012-09-24.
SEGEPLAN (2001). Plan de desarollo departamental El Progreso 2011–2025 (in Spanish). Guatemala: Secretaría de Planificación y Programación de la Presidencia SEGEPLAN. Retrieved 2016-10-29.

 
Departments of Guatemala
1908 establishments in North America
1934 establishments in Guatemala
1920 disestablishments in North America